Pseudocapacitance is the electrochemical storage of electricity in an electrochemical capacitor known as a pseudocapacitor. This faradaic charge transfer originates by a very fast sequence of reversible faradaic redox, electrosorption or intercalation processes on the surface of suitable electrodes. Pseudocapacitance is accompanied by an electron charge-transfer between electrolyte and electrode coming from a de-solvated and adsorbed ion. One electron per charge unit is involved. The adsorbed ion has no chemical reaction with the atoms of the electrode (no chemical bonds arise) since only a charge-transfer takes place.

Faradaic pseudocapacitance only occurs together with static double-layer capacitance. Pseudocapacitance and double-layer capacitance both contribute inseparably to the total capacitance value.

The amount of pseudocapacitance depends on the surface area, material and structure of the electrodes. Pseudocapacitance may contribute more capacitance than double-layer capacitance for the same surface area by 100x.

The amount of electric charge stored in a pseudocapacitance is linearly proportional to the applied voltage. The unit of pseudocapacitance is farad.

History 
 Development of the double layer and pseudocapacitance model see Double layer (interfacial)
 Development of the electrochemical components see Supercapacitors

Redox reactions

Differences

Rechargeable batteries 
Redox reactions in batteries with faradaic charge-transfer between an electrolyte and the surface of an electrode were characterized decades ago. These chemical processes are associated with chemical reactions of the electrode materials usually with attendant phase changes. Although these chemical processes are relatively reversible, battery charge/discharge cycles often irreversibly produce unreversed chemical reaction products of the reagents. Accordingly, the cycle-life of rechargeable batteries is usually limited. Further, the reaction products lower power density.  Additionally, the chemical processes are relatively slow, extending charge/discharge times.

Electro-chemical capacitors 

A fundamental difference between redox reactions in batteries and in electrochemical capacitors (supercapacitors) is that in the latter, the reactions are a very fast sequence of reversible processes with electron transfer without any phase changes of the electrode molecules. They do not involve making or breaking chemical bonds. The de-solvated atoms or ions contributing the pseudocapacitance simply cling to the atomic structure of the electrode and charges are distributed on surfaces by physical adsorption processes. Compared with batteries, supercapacitor faradaic processes are much faster and more stable over time, because they leave only traces of reaction products. Despite the reduced amount of these products, they cause capacitance degradation. This behavior is the essence of pseudocapacitance.

Pseudocapacitive processes lead to a charge-dependent, linear capacitive behavior, as well as the accomplishment of non-faradaic double-layer capacitance in contrast to batteries, which have a nearly charge-independent behavior. The amount of pseudocapacitance depends on the surface area, material and structure of the electrodes. The pseudocapacitance may exceed the value of double-layer capacitance for the same surface area by 100x.

Capacitance functionality 

Applying a voltage at the capacitor terminals moves the polarized ions or charged atoms in the electrolyte to the opposite polarized electrode. Between the surfaces of the electrodes and the adjacent electrolyte an electric double-layer forms. One layer of ions on the electrode surface and the second layer of adjacent polarized and solvated ions in the electrolyte move to the opposite polarized electrode. The two ion layers are separated by a single layer of electrolyte molecules. Between the two layers, a static electric field forms that results in double-layer capacitance. Accompanied by the electric double-layer, some de-solvated electrolyte ions pervade the separating solvent layer and are adsorbed by the electrode's surface atoms. They are specifically adsorbed and deliver their charge to the electrode. In other words, the ions in the electrolyte within the Helmholtz double-layer also act as electron donors and transfer electrons to the electrode atoms, resulting in a faradaic current. This faradaic charge transfer, originated by a fast sequence of reversible redox reactions, electrosorptions or intercalation processes between electrolyte and the electrode surface is called pseudocapacitance.

Depending on the electrode's structure or surface material, pseudocapacitance can originate when specifically adsorbed ions pervade the double-layer, proceeding in several one-electron stages. The electrons involved in the faradaic processes are transferred to or from the electrode's valence-electron states (orbitals) and flow through the external circuit to the opposite electrode where a second double-layer with an equal number of opposite-charged ions forms. The electrons remain in the strongly ionized and electrode surface's "electron hungry" transition-metal ions and are not transferred to the adsorbed ions. This kind of pseudocapacitance has a linear function within narrow limits and is determined by the potential-dependent degree of surface coverage of the adsorbed anions. The storage capacity of the pseudocapacitance is limited by the finite quantity of reagent or of available surface.

Systems that give rise to pseudocapacitance:
 Redox system: Ox + ze‾ ⇌ Red
 Intercalation system:  in ""
 Electrosorption, underpotential deposition of metal adatoms or H:  + ze‾ + S ⇌ SM  or  + e‾ + S ⇌ SH (S = surface lattice sites)

All three types of electrochemical processes have appeared in supercapacitors.

When discharging pseudocapacitance, the charge transfer is reversed and the ions or atoms leave the double-layer and spread throughout the electrolyte.

Materials 

Electrodes' ability to produce pseudocapacitance strongly depends on the electrode materials' chemical affinity to the ions adsorbed on the electrode surface as well as on the electrode pore structure and dimension. Materials exhibiting redox behavior for use as pseudocapacitor electrodes are transition-metal oxides inserted by doping in the conductive electrode material such as active carbon, as well as conducting polymers such as polyaniline or derivatives of polythiophene covering the electrode material.

Transition metal oxides/sulfides 

These materials provide high pseudocapacitance and were thoroughly studied by Conway. Many oxides of transition metals like ruthenium, iridium, iron, manganese or sulfides such as titanium sulfide or their combinations generate faradaic electron–transferring reactions with low conducting resistance.

Ruthenium dioxide in combination with sulfuric acid electrolyte provides one of the best examples of pseudocapacitance, with a charge/discharge over a window of about 1.2 V per electrode. Furthermore, the reversibility on these transition metal electrodes is excellent, with a cycle life of more than several hundred-thousand cycles. Pseudocapacitance originates from a coupled, reversible redox reaction with several oxidation steps with overlapping potential. The electrons mostly come from the electrode's valence orbitals. The electron transfer reaction is very fast and can be accompanied with high currents.

The electron transfer reaction takes place according to:

 where 

During charge and discharge,  (protons) are incorporated into or removed from the  crystal lattice, which generates storage of electrical energy without chemical transformation. The OH groups are deposited as a molecular layer on the electrode surface and remain in the region of the Helmholtz layer. Since the measurable voltage from the redox reaction is proportional to the charged state, the reaction behaves like a capacitor rather than a battery, whose voltage is largely independent of the state of charge.

Conducting polymers 
Another type of material with a high amount of pseudocapacitance is electron-conducting polymers. Conductive polymer such as polyaniline, polythiophene, polypyrrole and polyacetylene have a lower reversibility of the redox processes involving faradaic charge transfer than transition metal oxides, and suffer from a limited stability during cycling.  Such electrodes employ electrochemical doping or dedoping of the polymers with anions and cations. Highest capacitance and power density are achieved with a n/p-type polymer configuration, with one negatively charged (n-doped) and one positively charged (p-doped) electrode.

Structure
Pseudocapacitance may originate from the electrode structure, especially from the material pore size. The use of carbide-derived carbons (CDCs) or carbon nanotubes (CNTs) as electrodes provides a network of small pores formed by nanotube entanglement. These nanoporous materials have diameters in the range of <2 nm that can be referred to as intercalated pores. Solvated ions in the electrolyte are unable to enter these small pores, but de-solvated ions that have reduced their ion dimensions are able to enter, resulting in larger ionic packing density and increased charge storage. The tailored sizes of pores in nano-structured carbon electrodes can maximize ion confinement, increasing specific capacitance by faradaic  adsorption treatment. Occupation of these pores by de-solvated ions from the electrolyte solution occurs according to (faradaic) intercalation.

Verification

Pseudocapacitance properties can be expressed in a cyclic voltammogram. For an ideal double-layer capacitor, the current flow is reversed immediately upon reversing the potential yielding a rectangular-shaped voltammogram, with a current independent of the electrode potential. For double-layer capacitors with resistive losses, the shape changes to a parallelogram. In faradaic electrodes the electrical charge stored in the capacitor is strongly dependent on the potential, therefore, the voltammetry characteristics deviate from the parallelogram due to a delay while reversing the potential, ultimately coming from kinetic charging processes.

Applications 
Pseudocapacitance is an important property in supercapacitors.

Literature

References 

Capacitors